Volleyball at the 1980 Summer Paralympics in Arnhem consisted of standing and sitting volleyball events for men.

Medal summary

Medal table

References 

 

1980 Summer Paralympics events
1980
Paralympics